George Summerbee (22 October 1914 – 19 April 1955) was an English professional footballer who played in The Football League for four clubs. He was father of Mike Summerbee and grandfather of Nicky Summerbee, who both played for Manchester City.

Life
Summerbee was born in Winchester, England and died in Cirencester, England.

Playing and managerial career
Summerbee began his professional career with Aldershot, who he joined from non-league side Basingstoke Town in May 1934. While at Aldershot he played alongside his brother Gordon. In January 1935 George joined Football League First Division side Preston North End for £650. In 11 years at Deepdale, Summerbee made just three Football League appearances. During this spell he also spent several years during the Second World War guesting for Portsmouth, where he made 149 competitive appearances while working at a nearby aircraft factory.

He joined Football League Division Three North side Chester in May 1946 for £600, where again he struggled to earn a regular first-team place, and he moved to Barrow. He made more than 100 league appearances in three years at Holker Street, with his final Football League outing being against Lincoln City in May 1950.

Summerbee then joined non-league side Cheltenham Town as player-manager in 1950, but he left in 1952 after his contract was not renewed. He died just three years later from Addison's disease, after a spell scouting for Bristol City.

His life story is featured alongside the other footballing members of his family in Fathers, Sons and Football (Colin Shindler, Headline Book Publishing, 2001).

References

External links
The Independent article on football families, featuring the Summerbees

English footballers
English football managers
English Football League players
Association football midfielders
Basingstoke Town F.C. players
Aldershot F.C. players
Preston North End F.C. players
Chester City F.C. players
Barrow A.F.C. players
Portsmouth F.C. wartime guest players
Cheltenham Town F.C. players
Cheltenham Town F.C. managers
Sportspeople from Winchester
Deaths from Addison's disease
1914 births
1955 deaths
Footballers from Hampshire